The 2nd European Women's Artistic Gymnastics Championships were held in Kraków.

Medalists

Results

All-around

Vault

Uneven bars

Balance beam

Floor

References

1959
International gymnastics competitions hosted by Poland
European_Women%27s_Artistic_Gymnastics_Championships
Euro